The red-faced liocichla (Liocichla phoenicea) is a species of bird in the family Leiothrichidae.

Distribution and habitat
L. phoenicea is found in Bangladesh, Bhutan, Myanmar, Northeast India, Nepal and western Yunnan. Its natural habitat is subtropical or tropical moist, montane forests. When foraging, it moves through the dense undergrowth of tropical broad-leaf forest in pairs, or in flocks with or without other species.

References

Collar, N. J. & Robson C. 2007. Family Timaliidae (Babblers)  pp. 70 – 291 in; del Hoyo, J., Elliott, A. & Christie, D.A. eds. Handbook of the Birds of the World, Vol. 12. Picathartes to Tits and Chickadees. Lynx Edicions, Barcelona.

red-faced liocichla
Birds of Bhutan
Birds of Northeast India
Birds of Myanmar
Birds of Yunnan
red-faced liocichla
Taxonomy articles created by Polbot